Wizards and Rogues of the Realms is an accessory for the 2nd edition of the Advanced Dungeons & Dragons fantasy role-playing game, published in 1995.

Contents
Wizards and Rogues of the Realms features character class kits for wizards and rogues of the Forgotten Realms campaign world. The book also introduces two new character classes, the Shadow Walkers and the Spellsingers. A Spellsinger is a magic user with immediate access to nearly the entire selection of spells at first level, although casting spells is done in the form of singing and dancing and takes much longer, and there is a chance of spell failure. A Shadow Walker is similar to a thief but with limited magic use. The format of each kit includes an overview of the character's home area and a description of the native clothing, roleplaying guidelines, and a list of special abilities and disadvantages, along with statistics for racial and ability requirements, and proficiencies.

Publication history
Wizards and Rogues of the Realms was designed by William W. Connors, and published by TSR in 1995. The interior artists were Ned Dameron and Valarie Valusek.

Shannon Appelcline commented that among other changes to the Forgotten Realms publications in the 1990s, "There was also a proliferation of adventures, often laid out in trilogies, and finally a number of more player-oriented books — doubtless intended to sell like the PHBR volumes. Some of these volumes, like Wizards and Rogues of the Realms (1995) and Warriors and Priests of the Realms (1996) even shared the same trade dress."

Reception
Cliff Ramshaw reviewed Wizards and Rogues of the Realms for Arcane magazine, rating it a 5 out of 10 overall. He criticized that adjustments to character mechanics were "generally no more than tweaks, and as such are a little uninspiring", with a few exceptions including "wizards that cast offensive spells at two levels beyond their ability, and wizards that gain intelligence-determined spell bonuses in the way that clerics gain wisdom bonuses". Ramshaw concluded the review: "The book suggests that players should choose kits for their roleplaying potential rather than for any extra power they may yield. Better yet, players could instead consult the Skills & Powers tome and customise the backgrounds, personalities and abilities of their characters as they see fit."

Reviews
Dragon #229

References

Forgotten Realms sourcebooks
Role-playing game supplements introduced in 1995